Kevin James (born 1965) is an American actor and comedian.

Kevin James may also refer to:

 Kevin James (broadcaster) (born 1963), American radio presenter and political candidate
 Kevin James (cricketer) (born 1987), West Indian cricketer
 Kevin James (English footballer) (born 1980), footballer for Dulwich Hamlet
 Kevin James (magician) (born 1962), French-born American magician
 Kevin James (Scottish footballer) (born 1975), footballer for Ayr United
 Kevin James (bowls) (born 1984), Welsh lawn bowler
 Kevin James, convicted on charges of terrorism relating to the 2005 Los Angeles bomb plot